The Oa is a rocky peninsula in the southwest of the island of Islay, in Argyll, Scotland. It is an RSPB nature reserve.

Area
The area is roughly circular, and connects with the rest of the island at a relatively narrow neck, which runs between Kintra and Port Ellen. Its high point is Beinn Mhòr in the south. The Oa had a population of 800 people in 1830, but became deserted due to the Highland Clearances.

The American Monument was erected on the south coast by the American Red Cross to commemorate the loss of two ships in 1918 – the liner  and the armed merchant cruiser .

The area around the memorial is an RSPB nature reserve, where chough, golden eagles, corn crakes, and sea birds can be seen.  have been designated as a Special Protection Area for the protection of the chough.

Ireland can be seen from the south coast on a clear day.

References

External links
 

Landforms of Islay
Royal Society for the Protection of Birds reserves in Scotland